Jeff Stetson is an American writer best known for such novels and plays as Blood on the Leaves and The Meeting, a 1987 play about an imaginary meeting between Martin Luther King Jr. and Malcolm X in 1965 in a hotel in Harlem. The play was later televised on American Playhouse in 1989.

References

External links

Community Leadership Award

African-American dramatists and playwrights
American dramatists and playwrights
African-American novelists
African-American screenwriters
American television writers
American male television writers
American male novelists
American male screenwriters
American male dramatists and playwrights
Living people
Year of birth missing (living people)
21st-century African-American people
African-American male writers